Baba Armando Adamu (born 20 October 1979), known occasionally simply by his nickname Armando, is a Ghanaian former professional football striker. He made nine appearances for scoring twice the Ghana national team.

International career
Baba made his international debut for Ghana against Jamaica on 7 August 1999. He scored for Ghana on his debut. He currently has 8 caps, the last of which was in a 1–0 defeat against Mexico on 1 March 2006 in a Pre-2006 FIFA World Cup International friendly in Frisco, Texas, US. In these 8 appearances, he has scored a total of 2 goals.

Baba was a member of the Ghana squad that played in the 2006 African Cup of Nations. He was however not selected into the Ghana squad that played in the 2006 FIFA World Cup, even after impressing during the African Cup Tournament.

He scored against Zimbabwe during the 2006 African Cup of Nations in Egypt.

Baba was selected as part of the provisional 28-man squad for the World Cup, but was controversially left out of the final 23-man Squad because of indiscipline, a trait that many believe caused him to have an inconsistent Club and International career.

Adamu was never likely to get much playing time for Ghana with the likes of Matthew Amoah, Joetex Frimpong and Prince Tagoe ahead of him in the pecking order for the striking berths. He did, however, make an appearance at the start of the second half against Zimbabwe and scored Ghana's consolation goal in a 2–1 loss.

References

External links
 Krylia Sovetov Samara Profile (In Russian)
 
 Player Profile : Baba Armando Adamu – Ghanaweb.com

1979 births
Living people
Footballers from Kumasi
Ghanaian footballers
Association football forwards
Ghana international footballers
2006 Africa Cup of Nations players
UAE Pro League players
Saudi Professional League players
Süper Lig players
Russian Premier League players
All Blacks F.C. players
Al Shabab Al Arabi Club Dubai players
Asante Kotoko S.C. players
FC Chernomorets Novorossiysk players
FC Rostov players
FC Lokomotiv Moscow players
FC Dinamo Minsk players
Al-Nasr SC (Dubai) players
FC Moscow players
PFC Krylia Sovetov Samara players
Sakaryaspor footballers
Al Hilal SFC players
King Faisal Babes FC players
Ghanaian expatriate footballers
Ghanaian expatriate sportspeople in Russia
Expatriate footballers in Russia
Expatriate footballers in Turkey
Expatriate footballers in Belarus
Ghanaian expatriate sportspeople in Turkey
Expatriate footballers in the United Arab Emirates